John Kaleo (born February 5, 1971) is a retired American football quarterback in the Arena Football League (AFL) for the Albany Firebirds (1993), Cleveland Thunderbolts (1994), St. Louis Stampede (1995–1996), Anaheim Piranhas (1997), San Jose SaberCats (1997), New England Sea Wolves (1999), Tampa Bay Storm (2000–2003, 2007), Austin Wranglers (2004), Los Angeles Avengers (2005), and Columbus Destroyers (2006). He won ArenaBowl XVII with the Storm in 2003.  He retired from playing after the 2007 season, and is currently the offensive coordinator for the Tampa Bay Storm.  Prior to this role, he was quarterbacks coach and offensive coordinator at Iona College in New Rochelle, New York.

High school career
John Kaleo attended South River High School in Edgewater, Maryland and Bowie High School in Bowie, Maryland. John Kaleo was a one-year varsity starter at South River High School and two-year starter at quarterback on the Bowie High football team, and also played basketball, track & field, and baseball.

College career
Kaleo attended Montgomery College for two years. As a sophomore, he was a Junior College All-American, the NJCAA Player of the Year, and was voted the JUCO Player of the Year by the  Washington, D.C. Touchdown Club.

Kaleo then transferred to the University of Maryland for his final two seasons. As a senior, he set single-season school records in passing yards (3,392), completions (286), attempts (482), total yards (3,472) as well as single-game touchdown passes with five.  After his senior year, he participated in the Blue–Gray Football Classic.

Coaching career
He served two seasons, 2007 and 2008, as the offensive coordinator and quarterbacks coach for the Iona College Gaels. Newly hired Towson head coach Rob Ambrose selected Kaleo as his quarterbacks coach. He currently has two sons by the names of Parker and Carson.

Notes

External links
 Stats at ArenaFan
 Kaleo Isn't Ready to Exit Arena

1971 births
Albany Firebirds players
American football quarterbacks
American players of Canadian football
Anaheim Piranhas players
Austin Wranglers players
Canadian football quarterbacks
Cleveland Thunderbolts players
Columbus Destroyers players
Iona Gaels football coaches
Living people
Los Angeles Avengers players
Maryland Terrapins football players
Montgomery College alumni
New England Sea Wolves players
People from Bowie, Maryland
San Jose SaberCats players
St. Louis Stampede players
Tampa Bay Storm players
Toronto Argonauts players
Towson Tigers football coaches
University of Maryland, College Park alumni